Kristian Mathias Fimland (16 February 1889 – 1959) was a Norwegian politician for the Liberal Party.

He served as a deputy representative to the Norwegian Parliament from Østfold during the term 1950–1953.

References

1889 births
Year of death missing
Deputy members of the Storting
Østfold politicians
Liberal Party (Norway) politicians